Presentation is the process of presenting the content of a topic to an audience.
 Corel Presentations, a slideshow, presentation and graphics editing software similar to PowerPoint
 Presentation program, computer software used to make presentations, such as Microsoft PowerPoint

Religious
 Presentation of Jesus at the Temple, in the Bible, when Jesus was brought to the temple forty days after his birth
 Presentation of Mary, an event recognized by the Eastern Orthodox and Catholic Churches, mentioned in the Infancy Narrative of the Gospel of James

Presentation may also refer to:
 Presentation (medical) referring to the initial symptoms or signs
 Presentation (philosophy), a synonym for mental representation
 Presentation of food, the aesthetics of the appearance of food
 Right of presentation
 Lordosis behavior, a body posture adopted by some mammals during estrus that is commonly referred to as "presenting"
 Presentation (obstetrics) in obstetrics
 Presentation (software), an application used to create neurobehavioral experiments
 Presentation High School (disambiguation), a list of Presentation High Schools
 Presentation layer, in computer networking, the sixth level of the seven layer OSI model
 Presentation of a group, in mathematics, a way to describe a group